NPCC may refer to:

 National Police Cadet Corps, a student uniformed organisation in Singapore
 National Police Chiefs' Council, a co-ordinating body for policing in the UK (replacing the previous Association of Chief Police Officers)
 Northeast Power Coordinating Council, one of nine regional electric reliability councils under North American Electric Reliability Corporation (NERC) authority
 North Point Community Church, a megachurch in Atlanta
 NPCC Enterprises, a website development company in Wilkes-Barre, Pennsylvania
 New York City Panel on Climate Change, an advisory panel to the New York City Mayor on climate change modeled on the Intergovernmental Panel on Climate Change (IPCC)
 National Power Control Centre, power control centre in Pakistan